Immediate Family may refer to:

 Immediate family
 Immediate Family (film), a 1989 drama film
 Immediate Family (book), a 1992 photography book by Sally Mann